Skødstrup is a suburb located north-east of Aarhus in Denmark. The suburb is also a railway town at Grenaabanen, the railroad between the cities of Aarhus and Grenaa. Today Skødstrup has grown together with the adjoining railway town of Løgten into a small urban area named Løgten-Skødstrup with a population of 8,197 (1 January 2019).

Skødstrup elementary school has more than 1250 students making it one of the largest schools in the region.

References

External links 

Neighborhoods of Aarhus